The 1894 Princeton Tigers football team was an American football team that represented Princeton University as an independent during the 1894 college football season. The team compiled an 8–2 record, shut out six of ten opponents, and outscored all opponents by a total of 208 to 44.. Thomas Trenchard was the team captain.

There was no contemporaneous system in 1894 for determining a national champion. However, Princeton was retroactively named as the national champion by one selector, the Houlgate System. Most of the other selectors chose Yale (16–0 record) as the national champion for 1894. Yale also defeated Princeton in head-to-head competition.

Two Princeton players, tackle Langdon Lea and guard Art Wheeler, were selected as consensus first-team players on the 1894 All-America team.  Lea and Wheeler were both later inducted into the College Football Hall of Fame.

Schedule

References

Princeton
Princeton Tigers football seasons
College football national champions
Princeton Tigers football